Lavry is a village in Pechorsky District of Pskov Oblast, Russia. Population: . The westernmost point of mainland Russia is located near the village.  Lavry is located about 400 miles west of the capital city of Moscow.  Lavry is located in the "Europe/Moscow" time zone, which is three hours ahead of standard UTC time (London).

References

Rural localities in Pskov Oblast